Netball at the 2007 Arafura Games in Darwin, Australia was held from 13–18 May 2007.

Results

Table

Pool games

Bronze Medal match

Gold Medal match

Final standings

See also
 Netball at the Arafura Games

References

2007
2007 in netball
2007 in Australian netball
May 2007 sports events in Australia